The discography of the Notorious B.I.G., an American rapper, consists of two studio albums, three posthumous albums, two compilation albums, one soundtrack and 27 singles (including 17 as a featured artist).

Albums

Studio albums

Posthumous albums

Compilation albums

Soundtracks

Singles

As lead artist

As featured artist

Other charted songs

Appearances

See also
 Junior M.A.F.I.A.#Discography
 List of songs recorded by the Notorious B.I.G.

Notes

References

Hip hop discographies
Discographies of American artists
Discography